Tułkowice may refer to:

 Tułkowice, Podkarpackie Voivodeship, a village in Poland
 Tułkowice, Świętokrzyskie Voivodeship, a village in Poland

See also
 , a village in Ukraine known as Tułkowice in Polish